The Kākāpō River is a river of New Zealand. It is located in the West Coast Region of the South Island. The river flows northwest from its source three kilometres west of Mount Kendall, reaching its outflow into the Karamea River 15 kilometres from the latter's mouth.

See also
List of rivers of New Zealand

References

Rivers of the West Coast, New Zealand
Rivers of New Zealand